György Tumpek (12 January 1929 – 21 December 2022) was a Hungarian swimmer and Olympic medalist. He was born in Budapest. He participated at the 1956 Summer Olympics, winning a bronze medal in 200 metre butterfly.

References

External links

1929 births
2022 deaths
Swimmers from Budapest
Hungarian male swimmers
Olympic swimmers of Hungary
Olympic bronze medalists for Hungary
Swimmers at the 1956 Summer Olympics
World record setters in swimming
Olympic bronze medalists in swimming
European Aquatics Championships medalists in swimming
European champions for Hungary
Medalists at the 1956 Summer Olympics
Male butterfly swimmers